Robert Clayton Ames (March 6, 1934 – April 18, 1983) was an American spy, the Central Intelligence Agency's Near East Director. He was killed in the 1983 United States embassy bombing in Beirut.

Early life
Raised in Philadelphia he was a 1956 graduate of La Salle University. While at La Salle, he was a member of the La Salle basketball team which won the NCAA championship in 1954 and was runner-up in 1955.

Career
In 1956, he joined the US Army, from which he switched to the Central Intelligence Agency (CIA), specializing in the Middle East. He rose to become the CIA's chief analyst for the area. Working for the CIA's Middle East Directorate of Operations, Ames is reputed to have made the first high-level penetration of the PLO. It is claimed one of two senior contacts he made was the high-ranking PLO commander Ali Hassan Salameh.

Ames was killed on April 18, 1983, when a suicide bomber detonated a bomb at the United States embassy in Beirut. A total of 63 people were killed in the explosion, including Ames, the CIA Lebanon station chief and his deputy, as well as six other CIA officers and eight other Americans. CIA Director William Casey described the loss of Ames as "the closest thing to an irreplaceable man".

US President Ronald Reagan and his wife, Nancy Reagan, attended the ceremony marking the arrival of the victims’ coffins at Andrews Air Force Base. A memorial service for them, held at Washington National Cathedral, was attended by three thousand people. Ames is buried at Arlington National Cemetery.

Personal life
He was married with six children.

He is the uncle of former Major League Baseball pitcher Mark Gubicza.

References

Further reading
 Bird, Kai. The Good Spy: The Life and Death of Robert Ames. New York: Crown Publishing, 2014. . .

External links
 Ames' gravesite at Arlington National Cemetery via ANC Explorer

1934 births
1983 deaths
American men's basketball players
American people murdered abroad
American terrorism victims
Analysts of the Central Intelligence Agency
Assassinated American diplomats
Basketball players from Philadelphia
Burials at Arlington National Cemetery

Deaths by car bomb in Lebanon
La Salle Explorers men's basketball players
Mass murder victims
People murdered in Lebanon